The 2018 Bulgarian Cup Final was the final match of the 2017–18 Bulgarian Cup and the 78th final of the Bulgarian Cup. The final took place on 9 May 2018 at Vasil Levski National Stadium in Sofia. It was refereed by Nikola Popov.

The clubs contesting the final were Slavia Sofia and Levski Sofia. The match finished in a 0–0 draw, but Slavia clinched their eighth Bulgarian Cup title by winning 4–2 on penalties.

Route to the Final

Match

Details

References

Bulgarian Cup finals
Cup Final
PFC Slavia Sofia matches
PFC Levski Sofia matches
Bulgarian Cup Final 2018